Kazimierz Dziewoński (born 10 July 1910 in Ivanovo, died 4 November 1994 near Warsaw) was a human geographer.

Professor at the Polish Academy of Sciences since 1954. President of the Commission for Methods of Economic Regionalization of the International Geographical Union in 1960-1964. Honorary member of numerous learned societies. His research focuses on cities, localization and methodology.

References
Encyklopedia PWN

Polish geographers
People from Ivanovo
Academic staff of the Polish Academy of Sciences
1910 births
1994 deaths
20th-century geographers